Mutsuarashi Yukio (born Yukio Minami; January 12, 1943 – July 30, 2002) was a sumo wrestler from Tōhoku, Aomori, Japan. He made his professional debut in September 1961, and reached the top division in March 1967. He recorded 13 wins on his debut in the top division, a feat which has never been bettered and equaled only twice, by Kitanofuji in 1964 and Ichinojō in 2014. His highest rank was sekiwake. He retired in March 1976. He founded Ajigawa stable in 1979, although he was forced to retire early from the Japan Sumo Association in 1993 due to poor health and was succeeded by former yokozuna Asahifuji. He died in 2002 at the age of 59.

Career record

See also
Glossary of sumo terms
List of past sumo wrestlers
List of sumo tournament top division runners-up
List of sumo tournament second division champions
List of sekiwake

References

1943 births
Japanese sumo wrestlers
Sumo people from Aomori Prefecture
Sekiwake
2002 deaths

ja:若見山幸平